Paul Jones was lynched on November 2, 1919, after being accused of attacking a fifty-year-old white woman in Macon, Georgia.

Lynching of Paul Jones

On Sunday, November 2, 1919, Paul Jones allegedly attacked a white woman about  outside of Macon. Paul Jones was chased through town until he was cornered in a rail boxcar, there the woman positively identified him. A white mob of 400 people quickly assembled and over the protests of Sheriff James R. Hicks they seized Jones. His body was riddled with bullets after being lynched, "saturated with coal oil" and lit on fire. He was still alive as the flames consumed his body and the mob watched as he writhed in pain.  There were no arrests.

Aftermath

These race riots were one of several incidents of civil unrest that began in the so-called American Red Summer of 1919, which included terrorist attacks on black communities and white oppression in over three dozen cities and counties. In most cases, white mobs attacked African American neighborhoods. In some cases, black community groups resisted the attacks, especially in Chicago and Washington DC. Most deaths occurred in rural areas during events like the Elaine Race Riot in Arkansas, where an estimated 100 to 240 black people and 5 white people were killed. Also in 1919 were the Chicago Race Riot and Washington D.C. race riot which killed 38 and 39 people respectively. Both had many more non-fatal injuries and extensive property damage reaching into the millions of dollars.

See also
Jenkins County, Georgia, riot of 1919
Lynching of Berry Washington in Milan, Georgia
Putnam County, Georgia, arson attack

Bibliography 
Notes

References

 - Total pages: 368 
 
  

1919 deaths
1919 murders in the United States
Deaths by firearm in Georgia (U.S. state)
Deaths by person in Georgia (U.S. state)
Lynching deaths in Georgia (U.S. state)
People murdered in Georgia (U.S. state)
1919 in Georgia (U.S. state)
1919 riots in the United States
November 1919 events
Arson in Georgia (U.S. state)
Riots and civil disorder in Georgia (U.S. state)
White American riots in the United States
Racially motivated violence against African Americans
Red Summer
Attacks on African-American churches
Deaths from fire in the United States